Walbridge is a village in Wood County, Ohio, United States, within the Toledo metropolitan area. The population was 3,019 at the 2010 census.

History
Walbridge was platted in 1874. A post office called Walbridge has been in operation since 1871. The village was incorporated in 1912.

Geography
Walbridge is located at  (41.588350, -83.489503).

Demographics

2010 census
At the 2010 census there were 3,019 people, 1,458 households, and 825 families living in the village. The racial makeup of the village was 95.9% White, 0.7% African American, 0.3% Native American, 0.3% Asian, 1.1% from other races, and 1.8% from two or more races. Hispanic or Latino of any race were 5.6%.

Of the 1,458 households 21.5% had children under the age of 18 living with them, 40.3% were married couples living together, 11.7% had a female householder with no husband present, 4.6% had a male householder with no wife present, and 43.4% were non-families. 37.5% of households were one person and 16.7% were one person aged 65 or older. The average household size was 2.07 and the average family size was 2.68.

The median age in the village was 47.4 years. 17.7% of residents were under the age of 18; 8.2% were between the ages of 18 and 24; 20.8% were from 25 to 44; 29.5% were from 45 to 64; and 23.8% were 65 or older. The gender makeup of the village was 46.1% male and 53.9% female.

2000 census
At the 2000 census there were 2,546 people, 1,078 households, and 743 families living in the village. The population density was 1,532.0 people per square mile (592.2/km). There were 1,110 housing units at an average density of 667.9 per square mile (258.2/km).  The racial makeup of the village was 97.29% White, 0.51% African American, 0.31% Native American, 0.24% Asian, 0.71% from other races, and 0.94% from two or more races. Hispanic or Latino of any race were 2.67%.

Of the 1,078 households 28.4% had children under the age of 18 living with them, 53.0% were married couples living together, 12.3% had a female householder with no husband present, and 31.0% were non-families. 27.5% of households were one person and 10.4% were one person aged 65 or older. The average household size was 2.35 and the average family size was 2.85.

The age distribution was 23.4% under the age of 18, 9.0% from 18 to 24, 26.7% from 25 to 44, 24.7% from 45 to 64, and 16.3% 65 or older. The median age was 40 years. For every 100 females there were 90.0 males. For every 100 females age 18 and over, there were 88.7 males.

The median household income was $40,234 and the median family income was $54,063. Males had a median income of $44,185 versus $26,042 for females. The per capita income for the village was $19,783. About 3.7% of families and 4.7% of the population were below the poverty line, including 2.5% of those under age 18 and 4.6% of those age 65 or over.

Education
Walbridge has a public library, a branch of the Wood County District Public Library.

Notable person
Dominick Evans – filmmaker and activist
Ed Scott - A right-handed pitcher who appeared for two years in the major leagues.

References

Villages in Wood County, Ohio
Villages in Ohio